The Hangzhou–Ningbo high-speed railway, or Hangyong high-speed railway or Hang–Yong passenger-dedicated railway  is a High-speed railway between the major cities of Hangzhou and Ningbo in Zhejiang province.

In the railway's short name, "" stands for Hangzhou, and "" is a traditional short name for Ningbo.

Early on, the railway was scheduled to open in June 2012; later, the end of 2012 became the target date. It was announced in October 2012  that the completion of the project had been postponed again. Test operations began at the start of 2013 and commercial operations began on 30 June 2013.
The line runs parallel to the Xiaoshan–Ningbo railway.

References 

Buildings and structures under construction in China
Rail transport in Zhejiang